Anne Fleming (born 25 April 1964) is a Canadian fiction writer. Born in Toronto, Ontario, Fleming attended the University of Waterloo, enrolling in a geography program then moving to English studies. In 1991, she moved to British Columbia. She teaches at the University of British Columbia Okanagan campus in Kelowna. She formerly taught at the Victoria School of Writing.

Her fiction has been published in magazines and anthologies, including Toronto Life magazine, The Journey Prize Stories, and The New Quarterly, where it won a National Magazine Award.

Her first book, Pool-Hopping and Other Stories, was a finalist at the 1999 Governor General's Awards; it was also a contender for the Ethel Wilson Fiction Prize and the Danuta Gleed Award. Her second book is the novel, Anomaly (Raincoast Books 2005).

Aside from her literary endeavors, Fleming has hosted a radio program, played defense for the Vancouver Voyagers women's hockey team, and also plays the ukulele. She has a partner and child. Fleming's great-grandfather was the mayor of Toronto, and Toronto figures prominently in her writing.

In 2013 she served alongside Amber Dawn and Vivek Shraya on the jury of the Dayne Ogilvie Prize, a literary award for LGBT writers in Canada, selecting C. E. Gatchalian as that year's winner.

Bibliography

 Pool-Hopping and Other Stories, 1998
 Anomaly, 2005
 Gay Dwarves of America, 2012
 poemw, 2016
 The Goat, 2017

See also
 List of University of Waterloo people

References

External links
 Anne Fleming Official Website

1964 births
Living people
Writers from British Columbia
Canadian women novelists
Canadian lesbian writers
Writers from Toronto
Academic staff of the University of British Columbia
21st-century Canadian novelists
Canadian LGBT novelists
Canadian women short story writers
21st-century Canadian women writers
20th-century Canadian short story writers
21st-century Canadian short story writers
20th-century Canadian women writers
21st-century Canadian LGBT people
Lesbian novelists